M. nivea may refer to:

 Mitra nivea, a sea snail species
 Mitranthes nivea, a plant species endemic to Jamaica
 Mucuna nivea, a synonym for Mucuna pruriens

See also 
 Nivea (disambiguation)